Center Island is one of the San Juan Islands in San Juan County, Washington, United States. It lies off the eastern shore of Lopez Island, between it and Decatur Island. Center Island has a land area of 0.713 km² (0.275 sq mi, or 176.22 acres). The population was officially 49 persons as of the 2000 census.

Center Island is a 178-acre private island a short distance from Anacortes, nestled between Decatur and Lopez Islands. The island is served with electricity and telephone but accessible only by private boat or airplane. Most property owners boat from Anacortes and those without their own boat can arrange a water taxi from Skyline Marina in Anacortes or charter a flight. Most of the island is platted so all of the owners share in the common elements including the airfield, docks and boat ramp, boat/trailer storage lot, water system, clubhouse, caretakers quarters, beach lot, vehicles and other equipment useful in construction. There is a restriction of privately owned internal-combustion vehicles, so golf carts are the typical mode of transportation. The roads generally accommodate barged-in commercial vehicles for the delivering of construction materials. All residential building requires septic installation. Not all lots have access to the water system and those that are eligible are subject to evidence of the building and septic permits. Center Island is private so non-owners must be guests of owners or be escorted by an authorized person. There are mostly summer vacation homes there; however a small number of residents do live on Center year-round, including full-time caretakers. Facilities include a clubhouse, community picnic areas, a community dock and a place to pull small boats out of the water and put them on land. There is daily mail service and a private 1600' airstrip.

Transportation
The island is served by the Center Island Airport .

See also

References

Center Island: Block 2100, Census Tract 9605. San Juan County, Washington United States Census Bureau

San Juan Islands
Private islands of Washington (state)